4587 may refer to:
 Inmate 4587, Oliver Queen's prisoner number
 "Inmate 4587" (Arrow episode)
 4587 Rees